Damian Gorawski (born 4 January 1979) is a Polish former footballer who played as a right winger.

Club career
Gorawski was born in Ruda Śląska. He played for Ruch Chorzów, Wisła Kraków and FC Moscow. Though the fee transferring him to the Russian side was never made public, it was assumed to be around $1.9 million.

International career
Gorawski has appeared for Poland 14 times, scoring once.

He was named for the 23-men Polish squad for the 2006 FIFA World Cup finals held in Germany, but was subsequently dropped in favor of Bartosz Bosacki having failed medical tests after being diagnosed with severe asthma.

International goals

References

External links
  
  

Living people
1979 births
Sportspeople from Ruda Śląska
Association football midfielders
Polish footballers
Ruch Chorzów players
Wisła Kraków players
FC Moscow players
Russian Premier League players
Polish expatriate footballers
Expatriate footballers in Russia
FC Shinnik Yaroslavl players
Górnik Zabrze players
Poland international footballers